Al-Habboubi Square is a public square and roundabout in central Nasiriyah. The statue of the Iraqi Poet Mohammed Saeed Al-Habboubi is located in the square and the statue was built in 1971. it is at the intersection of Nile and Habboubi streets.

See also
 2020 Al-Habboubi Square attack

References

Dhi Qar Governorate
Squares in Iraq
National squares